Derek Matthew Waters (born July 30, 1979) is an American actor, comedian, screenwriter, producer, and director. He is best known for his work on the television series Drunk History (2013–2019), which earned him eight Primetime Emmy Award nominations.

Early life
Waters was raised in Lutherville, Maryland. Waters is dyslexic, and was in special education in school. As a child, he aspired to be a professional baseball player, but didn't make his high school team, and so became a Little League umpire. He attended Towson High School in Towson, Maryland, graduating in 1998. The following year, he went to Second City in Toronto, Canada, 1999 to study sketch and improv comedy.

Career
After moving to Los Angeles, he worked at Tower Video, a job he liked since he had never been exposed to independent movies before. He has performed sketch comedy in Los Angeles since 2000, and for many years was part of the comedy duo Derek & Simon with Simon Helberg. The two starred together in the web series Derek & Simon: The Show on the comedy website Super Deluxe, which they created with comedian Bob Odenkirk. They made two short films "Derek & Simon: The Pity Card" (co-starring Zach Galifianakis and Bill Hader) and "Derek & Simon: A Bee and a Cigarette" (co-starring Casey Wilson and Emily Rutherfurd) and had a pilot deal with HBO in 2005.

In 2003, he co-starred in the ABC series Married to the Kellys.

Waters has appeared on television programs such as The League, Funny or Die Presents, It's Always Sunny in Philadelphia, Nick Swardson's Pretend Time, Maron, Happy Endings, Suburgatory, The Sarah Silverman Program, Santa Clarita Diet, and The Middle. He has also appeared in films such as The Brothers Solomon, Hall Pass, For Your Consideration, and This Means War. Waters also voiced the self-centred, non sequitur-spouting weasel Dipster in the 2012 Shut Up! Cartoons series Weasel Town, starring with Jason Ritter.

Waters co-created and hosts the Comedy Central series Drunk History. The show originally started as a series of shorts for Funny or Die. The show has won multiple awards, such as the jury prize in short filmmaking at the Sundance Festival and was nominated for seventeen Primetime Emmy Awards, garnering Waters seven nominations.

Influences
Some of Waters's influences are Mark Borchardt and Christopher Guest.

References

External links
 

1979 births
Living people
American male comedy actors
American male film actors
American male television actors
American male comedians
American male screenwriters
American television producers
American television directors
Male actors from Maryland
Comedians from Maryland
Screenwriters from Maryland
21st-century American male actors
21st-century American comedians
People from Lutherville, Maryland
Towson High School alumni
Community College of Baltimore County alumni
21st-century American screenwriters
21st-century American male writers
Actors with dyslexia
Writers with dyslexia